Megantara Air was an Indonesian cargo airline based at Soekarno-Hatta International Airport. Operations started in May 2007; the airline operated freight charters and regular flights between Indonesia and Singapore.

In May 2009, the airline decided to suspend its operations. Its aircraft were later returned to Transmile Air Services of Malaysia. Megantara Air was listed in Category 2 by Indonesian Civil Aviation Authority for airline safety quality.

Fleet
The Megantara Air fleet (as of March 2009) was:

1  Boeing 727-200F 
1  Boeing 737-200F

The aircraft were transferred from Transmile.

Notes

External links
 Company website

Defunct airlines of Indonesia
Airlines established in 2007
Airlines disestablished in 2009
Defunct cargo airlines
Indonesian companies established in 2007
2009 disestablishments in Indonesia